Samsun Golf Club is a nine-hole golf course located in the Atakum district of Samsun Province, northern Turkey. It was created for the 2017 Summer Deaflympics.

Establishment
The golf course is situated in Denizevleri Mah., Adnan Menderes Boulevard 33 in Atakum, Samsun. Most of the area for the golf course, which initially covered , was obtained through filling a part of the seashore by rocks. Turkish media claim it to be first known golf course in the world built on a ground gained by filling the sea. It was established by the Metropolitan Municipality of Samsun. It was opened in the presence of the Minister of Foreign Affairs Mevlüt Çavuşoğlu and Minister of Youth and Sports Akif Çağatay Kılıç and with a "Federation Cup" tournament organized by the Turkish Golf Federation on July 15, 2016. Initially it had 9 holes. The golf course is a public venue. It hosted 250 professional golfers, and 85 people attended courses, in the first nine months of operation.

Extension
In order to meet international standards set by USGA, an extension project was launched. For this purpose, a total of 2.5 million tons of rocks of size 2–6 tons were dumped into the sea. The landscape of the facility is designed by the American golf architect Kevın Ramsey. Being at a seaside location, the golf course is of links-style, as most common in Ireland, Great Britain and Scotland. The 18-hole course is expected to be opened on July 18, 2018.

International events hosted
This is the venue for the golf events of the 2017 Summer Deaflympics between July 20–26.

References

Golf clubs and courses in Turkey
Sports venues in Samsun
Sports venues completed in 2016
2016 establishments in Turkey
Atakum